There are over thirty hospitals located in Toronto, Ontario, Canada. Many of them are also medical research facilities and teaching schools affiliated with the University of Toronto. Most hospitals are grouped under administrative networks that serve particular neighbourhoods and communities and share a number of medical services. The largest of the networks is University Health Network, which governs four of Canada’s largest research hospitals located across Downtown Toronto. Some hospitals in Toronto operate independently, attracting large funding and public donation due to historic brand value and overall clinical standards.

Existing hospitals

Closed hospitals 
 Wellesley Hospital (1942–2001)
 Central Hospital 1957 as a private care centre and later became Sherbourne Health Centre in 2003.
 The Doctor's Hospital (1953–1997) – merged with Toronto Western Hospital in 1996, merged again with Toronto General Hospital and closed in 1997; site at 340 College Street now home to Kensington Health, a long-term care facility and hospice for seniors. Doctors Hospital Clinic on the site retains the site's old name.
 Queen Elizabeth Hospital - merged with Hillcrest Hospital to form Rehabilitation Institute of Toronto (now Toronto Rehabilitation Institute)
 Humber River Hospital, Church and Keele Sites – some sections temporarily closed for renovation and most duplicated acute care services moved to Wilson Site on October 18, 2015
 Central Military Convalescence Hospital (1915-1918?) - formerly Wykeham Hall and later College Street Armouries
 Orthopaedic Military Hospital at Yonge and Davisville - established during World War I to handle returning injuries soldiers
 Christie Street Veterans' Hospital (1919-1948) - later as Lambert Lodge and demolished 1981. 
 Spadina Military Hospital (1914-1918?) - now 1 Spadina Crescent

See also 
 Health in Toronto
 Hospitals in York Region
 Hospitals in Canada

References

 
Toronto
Toronto
Hospitals
Hospitals in Toronto